The aspS RNA motif is a conserved RNA structure that was discovered by bioinformatics.
aspS motifs are found in a specific lineage of Actinomycetota.

aspS motif RNAs likely function as cis-regulatory elements, in view of their positions upstream of protein-coding genes.
Instances of the aspS RNA motif are often located nearby to the predicted Shine-Dalgarno sequence of the downstream gene.  This arrangement is consistent with a model of cis-regulation where the RNA allosterically controls access to the Shine-Dalgarno sequence, thus regulating the gene translationally.

aspS genes encode aminoacyl tRNA synthetases.  T-box leader RNAs detect low levels of various amino acids, and regulate genes in a cis-regulatory manner.  Genes regulated by T-box RNAs often include aminoacyl tRNA synthetases. It is possible that aspS RNAs are diverged examples of T-box RNAs, or they might implement a different structural solution to the same biological problem.

References

Non-coding RNA